Stob na Cruaiche (739 m) is a hill in the Grampian Mountains, Scotland. It lies on the border of Highland and Perthshire, on the northern edge of Rannoch Moor

A very isolated peak, it takes the form of a long ridge that encloses much of the northern side of Rannoch Moor. It can either be reach by Rannoch station or from Black Corries Lodge to the west.

References

Marilyns of Scotland
Grahams
Mountains and hills of Highland (council area)
Mountains and hills of Perth and Kinross